The Meyer Desert Formation biota is a fossilized biota (flora and fauna) found in the Dominion Range in the Transantarctic Mountains in Antarctica, alongside the Beardmore Glacier.

Since about 15 million years ago (Ma), Antarctica has been mostly covered with ice.

Fossil Nothofagus leaves in the Meyer Desert Formation of the Sirius Group show that intermittent warm periods allowed Nothofagus shrubs to cling to the Dominion Range as late as 3–4 Ma (mid-late Pliocene). After that the Pleistocene glaciation covered the whole continent with ice and destroyed all major plant life on it.

Species reported by Ashworth and Cantrill from about 3 million years ago include:

Animals:
Pisidium species (very small or minute freshwater clams, Sphaeriidae)
A lymnaeid gastropod (air-breathing freshwater snails)
 2 species of curculionid beetles (weevils)
 A cyclorrhaphid fly (Diptera)
 A tooth of an unknown species of freshwater fish

Plants:
Nothofagus beardmorensis (Fagales)
Ranunculus or similar achenes (Ranunculaceae?)
Mosses (apparently 5 types)
 Pollen, mostly Nothofagus
 Coniferous bisaccate pollen grains, perhaps Podocarpidites
 Pollen of the pollen genus Tricolpites
 Flowering cushion plants
A seed of Hippuris (mare's tails: Plantaginaceae)
A seed of Cyperaceae (sedges)
 3 or more types of liverworts

References

External links
Fossil weevils (Coleoptera: Curculionidae) from latitude 85 S Antarctica
Cenozoic terrestrial palynological assemblages in the glacial erratics from the Grove Mountains, east Antarctica
Neogene vegetation of the Meyer Desert Formation (Sirius Group), Transantarctic Mountains, Antarctica, by Allan C. Ashworth and David J. Cantrill
A Forest Grows in Antarctica
H.M. Li and Z.K. Zhou (2007) Fossil nothofagaceous leaves from the Eocene of western Antarctica and their bearing on the origin, dispersal and systematics of Nothofagus. Science in China. 50(10): 1525-1535.
 and  New grounds for reassessing palaeoclimate of the Sirius Group, Antarctica, G. J. Retallack, E. S. Krull and J. G. Bockheim:: full abstract, and passworded links to full article.

Cenozoic Antarctica
Paleontology in Antarctica
Prehistoric biotas
Transantarctic Mountains
Paleogene plants
Neogene plants
Pliocene extinctions